Royal Falcon Airlines was a charter airline based in Amman, Jordan.

History
Royal Falcon Airlines was set up in 2007. The operation was launched on a non-scheduled basis. In 2009, the airline became the second scheduled air carrier. The airline is a sister company to Jordan International Air Cargo (JIAC) which was established in 2005.

The company had its license suspended by the Civil Aviation Regulatory Commission in August 2016.

Destinations
Royal Falcon operated the following services (As of December 2013):

Erbil - Erbil International Airport
Najaf - Al Najaf International Airport
Mosul - Mosul International Airport

Amman - Queen Alia International Airport

Jeddah - King Abdulaziz International Airport

Cairo - Cairo International Airport

Abu Dhabi - Abu Dhabi International Airport

Fleet

The Royal Falcon fleet included the following aircraft (as of August 2016):

References

External links
Royal Falcon

Defunct airlines of Jordan
Airlines established in 2007
Airlines disestablished in 2016
Organisations based in Jordan with royal patronage
2016 disestablishments in Jordan
Jordanian companies established in 2007